Finley Township is an inactive township in Webster County, in the U.S. state of Missouri.

Finley Township was erected in 1855, taking its name from Finley Creek.

References

Townships in Missouri
Townships in Webster County, Missouri